Sir Philip Wodehouse, 1st Baronet (died 30 October 1623) was an English baronet, soldier and Member of Parliament.

Wodehouse was the son of Sir Roger Wodehouse, of Kimberley, Norfolk, and Mary, daughter of John Corbet and was educated at Trinity College, Cambridge (1575) and trained in the law at Lincoln's Inn (1580).

He sat as Member of Parliament for Castle Rising from 1586 to 1587.  He was knighted in 1596 for his actions during the Capture of Cadiz, and in 1611 he was created a Baronet, of Wilberhall in the County of Norfolk. He was appointed a Justice of the Peace for Norfolk from c. 1591 and High Sheriff of Norfolk for 1594–95. He was commissioner of musters for 1598 and Custos rotulorum in 1617.

Wodehouse married Grizell, daughter of William Yelverton, on 22 December 1582. He died on 30 October 1623 and was succeeded in the baronetcy by his son, Thomas. Lady Wodehouse died in August 1635.

He was an ancestor of the British humorist P. G. Wodehouse. A women's jacket in the collection of the Museum of Fine Arts, Boston is thought to have belonged to Grizell Wodehouse.

References

External links
 Wodehouse jacket: Textile Research Centre

1623 deaths
Alumni of Trinity College, Cambridge
Members of Lincoln's Inn
Baronets in the Baronetage of England
Philip Wodehouse, 1st Baronet
English MPs 1586–1587
High Sheriffs of Norfolk
Year of birth missing
English people of the Anglo-Spanish War (1585–1604)
People from Kimberley, Norfolk